Michael 'Mike' Gilbert (20 July 1947 – 14 August 2000) was a prolific U.S. fan artist in the late ’60s in Locus and other fanzines as well as an author, and publishing professional. Later he did illustrations for Fantasy Games Unlimited, Analog, F&SF, etc., and served as art director for If. He died August 14, 2000 of complications following open-heart surgery. He graduated from Rochester Institute of Technology in 1970. He married Sheila Gilbert, née Elkin, in 1971.

Gilbert won the Hugo Award for Best Fan Artist in 1971.

Bibliography

Chapterbooks

 The Day of the Ness (1975) with Andre Norton

Cover Art

 Victory on Janus (1968)
 Locus, June 24, 1969
 Locus, July 31, 1969
 Locus, August 23, 1969
 Locus, September 10, 1969
 Locus, December 31, 1969
 The Magazine of Fantasy and Science Fiction, February 1970
 If, March 1970
 Locus, April 9, 1970
 Locus, May 22, 1970
 Locus, October 20, 1970
 Locus, May 25, 1971
 Locus, January 22, 1972
 Breaking Point (1973)
 Analog Science Fiction/Science Fact, December 1974]
 The New SF Bulletin Index to SF Books 1974
 The Day of the Ness (1975)
 The Day of the Ness (1976)
 The Scream Factory #19, Summer 1997

Interior Art

 Pierheads in Space (1968)
 Cartoon: "Looks like another 'New Wave'" (1969)
 Locus #26 (1969)
 Locus #45 (1969)
 Locus #70 (1970)
 The Secret of the Time Vault (1971)
 The Habitat Manager (1971)
 Letter from an Unknown Genius (1971)
 A Little Knowledge (1971)
 Unfair Trade (1972)
 How to Design a Flying Saucer (1972)
 Lupoff's Book Week (1973)
 On Mars With Mike Gilbert (1974)
 Encounter Below Tharsis (1974)
 The Day of the Ness (1975)
 Blessing in Disguise (1976)
 "And Then There Were Nine . . ." (1977)
 The Last Battalion (1977)
 Trumpet #12 (1981)
 Cartoon: "Why Not to Use Electrical Outlets in Dungeons" (1986)
 Love of Life (1986)
 Empire's Horizon (map) (1989)
 The Last of the Renshai (map) (1992)
 Child of Thunder (Map) (1993)
 The Legend of Nightfall (map) (1993)
 Turning Point (map) (1993)
 The Glass Dragon (map) (1994)
 Profiteer (maps) (1995)
 Partisan (map) (1995)
 Fire Margins (maps) (1996)
 To Sheila E. Gilbert (1997)
 King's Dragon (map) (1997)
 The Dragon's Touchstone (map) (1997)
 The Broken Crown (Map) (1997)
 Razor's Edge (maps) (1997)
 The Uncrowned King (map) (1998)
 Sunderlies Seeking (map) (1998)
 Prince of Dogs (map) (1999)
 Dark Nadir (maps) (1999)
 Guardian of the Balance (map) (1999)
 Guardian of the Trust (map) (2000)
 Stronghold Rising (map / diagram) (2000)
 The Burning Stone (map) (2000)
 The Wizard's Treasure (Interior Montastery Map) (2000)
 Between Darkness and Light (map / diagrams) (2003)
 The Gathering Storm (map) (2003)
 The Riven Shield (map) (2003)
 The Hostile Takeover Trilogy (maps) (2004)
 Cartoon (Reap the Wild Wind) (2007)
 Map of Sholan Alliance and Valtegan Empire (Shades of Gray) (2010)
 Shades of Gray (drawings) (2010)
 The Stone Prince (map) (unknown)

Shortfiction

 The Happy Brotherhood (1985)
 The General's Bane (2000) with Sheila E. Gilbert

Essays

 Letter (The Alien Critic #9) (1974)
 On Mars With Mike Gilbert (1974)
 Letter (Science Fiction Review #14) (1975)
 Letter (Science Fiction Review #20) (1977)
 Letter (Science Fiction Review #22) (1977)
 Sabers, Lasers and Starships: An Introduction and Review of Science Fiction and Fantasy Wargaming (1979)
 Sabers, Lasers and Starships: An Introduction and Review of Science Fiction and Fantasy Wargaming, Part Two (1979)

Role Playing Games
 Royal Armies of the Hyborean Age (1975), illustrator.
 Bunnies & Burrows (1976), illustrator.
 Citadel (1976), illustrator.
 Archworld (1977), co-author with Sheila Gilbert & illustrator.
 Down Styphon! (1977), co-author & illustrator.
 The Blue-Light Manual (1977), illustrator.
 Broadsword (1977), illustrator.
 Chivalry & Sorcery (1977), illustrator.
 Chivalry & Sorcery Sourcebook (1978), illustrator.
 Swords & Sorcerers (1978), illustrator.
 Towers for Tyrants (1978), author & illustrator.
 Saurians (1979), illustrator.
 Privateers & Gentlemen (1982), illustrator.

References

1947 births
2000 deaths
American illustrators
Role-playing game artists